The 2021 ICC Men's T20 World Cup Asia Qualifier was a tournament that was played as part of qualification process for the 2022 ICC Men's T20 World Cup in October 2021. In April 2018, the International Cricket Council (ICC) granted full international status to Twenty20 men's matches played between member sides from 1 January 2019 onwards. Therefore, all the matches in the Regional Qualifiers were played as Twenty20 Internationals (T20Is). The Asia Qualifier consisted of two sub-regional groups, A and B, with the groups being played in Qatar and Malaysia respectively. The winners of each sub-regional group progressed to one of two global qualifiers. On 2 September 2021, the ICC announced that Group A had been moved from Kuwait to Qatar.

Originally, the qualifiers were scheduled to be played between March and September 2020. However, on 24 March 2020, the International Cricket Council (ICC) confirmed that all ICC qualifying events scheduled to take place before 30 June 2020 had been postponed due to the COVID-19 pandemic. In December 2020, the ICC updated the qualification pathway following the disruption from the pandemic. In March 2021, the Group A qualifier was postponed again, and was moved back to October 2021. In May 2021, the Group B qualifier was postponed to November 2021 due to the pandemic. However, in October 2021, the ICC cancelled the Group B tournament due to the COVID-19 pandemic, with Hong Kong progressing to the next stage as the highest-ranked team. Bahrain won Group A to progress to the Global Qualifiers, finishing just ahead of Qatar on net run rate.

Group A

Squads
The following teams and squads were named for the tournament:

Points table

 advanced to the global qualifier

Fixtures

Group B

For the original schedule, Singapore were placed in Group B. However, when the revised schedule was published by the ICC, Singapore had been promoted to the Global Qualifier at the expense of Hong Kong, due to a recalculation of the T20I team rankings. On 11 October 2021, the ICC cancelled the Group B tournament due to the COVID-19 pandemic, with Hong Kong progressing to the next stage as the highest-ranked team.

The following teams were scheduled to compete in Group B:

References

External links
 Series home at ESPN Cricinfo (Group A Qualifiers)

Associate international cricket competitions in 2021
Associate international cricket competitions in 2021–22
Qualifiers
ICC Men's T20 World Cup Asia Qualifier
ICC